A Christmas Album is the fifth studio album and the first Christmas album by Christian music singer Amy Grant. The album was recorded in nine studios in mid-1983 and was released later that same year.

It was issued on the heels of Grant's immensely successful 1982 LP Age to Age. Primarily for the audiences she attracted with Age to Age, A Christmas Album features well-known sacred and secular standards alongside original songs, and tracks from this album continue to receive airplay to this day during the holiday season on both secular and Christian radio stations. Although not as successful as Age to Age, A Christmas Album still peaked in the Top Ten of the Christian chart and spawned a Top 20 Christian radio single in "Emmanuel." The album would eventually be certified Gold in 1985, and Platinum in 1989. A Christmas Album was listed at No. 40 in the 2001 book, CCM Presents: The 100 Greatest Albums in Christian Music. In 2016, Grant re-recorded the song "Tennessee Christmas" as the opening track of her Christmas album of the same name. The song was released as a single from the album and charted at No. 50 on the Billboard Hot Christian Songs chart in December 2016.

Track listing

Personnel 

 Amy Grant – lead vocals (1, 2, 4–11), backing vocals (1)
 Shane Keister – Fender Rhodes (1), Yamaha GS1 (2, 3, 5, 8), Oberheim OB-8 (3, 4, 5, 8), Memorymoog (4), Minimoog (4), acoustic piano (7, 9, 10)
 Michael W. Smith – acoustic piano (2, 5, 6), Yamaha GS1 (4), Yamaha GS2 (7, 8), vocoder (10)
 Gary Chapman – acoustic guitar (1), pedal steel guitar (1), backing vocals (1)
 Jon Goin – electric guitar (1), acoustic guitar (2), guitar (4, 5, 7–10)
 Dean Parks – acoustic guitar (1)
 Mike Brignardello – bass (1, 2, 4, 5, 7–10)
 Paul Leim – drums (1, 2, 4, 5, 7, 9, 10), LinnDrum (4), Simmons drums (4), sleigh bells (5, 8), wood blocks (8)
 Victor Feldman – shaker (1), percussion (2, 5, 6)
 Lenny Castro – percussion (4)
 Farrell Morris – percussion (7, 9), bell tree (8), glockenspiel (8), coconut shells (8)
 Alan Moore – string arrangements (1, 2, 5–11), choir arrangements (2, 6, 11), horn arrangements (2, 5, 6, 11), woodwind arrangements (2, 6, 8, 10)
 Gavyn Wright – concertmaster (1, 2, 5–11)
 The Martyn Ford Orchestra – strings (1, 2, 5–11), horns (2), woodwinds (2, 8, 10)
 The Nashville Contemporary Brass Quintet – horns (5, 6, 11)
 Tom McAninch – horns (5, 6, 11)
 Fred Bock – choir director (2, 6, 11)
 The Hollywood Presbyterian Choir – choir (2, 6, 11)
 Bill Champlin – backing vocals (4, 11)
 Tamara Champlin – backing vocals (4, 11)
 Carmen Twillie – backing vocals (4, 11)
 Steve George – backing vocals (5)
 David Page – backing vocals (5)
 Richard Page – backing vocals (5)
 Debbie Hall – backing vocals (8, 9)
 Sandy Hall – backing vocals (8, 9)
 Edie Lehmann – backing vocals (8, 9)

Production

 Jim Baird – additional engineer
 Brown Bannister – producer
 Michael Blanton – cover art concept, executive producer
 Mike Borum – family photography
 Kevin Burns – assistant engineer
 Gary Chapman – executive producer
 Ken Corlew – additional engineer
 Gene Eichelberger – additional engineer
 Bill Farrell – cover photography, scenery
 Steve Ford – assistant engineer
 Daniel Garcia – assistant engineer
 Amy Grant – liner notes
 Dan Harrell – cover art concept, executive producer
 Dennis Hill – art direction
 Brent King – additional engineer
 Jerry Mahler – assistant engineer
 Rich Markowitz – assistant engineer
 Jack Joseph Puig – engineer, mixing
 Mike Ross – additional engineer
 Doug Sax – mastering at The Mastering Lab, Hollywood, California
 David Schober – assistant engineer

Chart positions

Awards
GMA Dove Awards

Pressings
A Christmas Album was the first Amy Grant album to be released in the Compact Disc format. The original CD issue had a manufacturing flaw that caused a small, but noticeable jump during the transition between tracks 3 and 4. The remastered version does not have this defect. The album was also released as a promotional only vinyl picture disc version in a die cut sleeve.

References 

Amy Grant albums
1983 Christmas albums
Albums produced by Brown Bannister
Christmas albums by American artists
Pop Christmas albums
Myrrh Records albums